Balsac the Jaws of Death (stylized BälSäc the Jaws ‘o Death) is the stage name of Mike Derks; the rhythm guitarist in the American heavy metal band Gwar since 1988. On stage he appears as a humanoid creature with a face resembling a bear-trap, usually portrayed wielding an enormous battleaxe.

History

Before Balsac joined the group in 1988, the original 1985 Gwar lineup featured two separate characters Jaws of Death and BalSac.  Jaws of Death played by Steve Douglas  (of Death Piggy), played guitar and wore a crude version of the familiar animal trap face. BalSac (1985-1987) played by Chris Bopst, played bass and wore a simple open-face piece of spiked headgear.  Douglas return to the band as Balsac the Jaws of Death for the recording of Gwar's first album Hell-O. He was replaced by Balsac shortly after.

Balsac has occasionally been featured as a vocalist. Balsac's vocals can be heard on the songs "Obliteration of Flab Quarv 7", from This Toilet Earth, and "Mary Anne" from We Kill Everything. Derks' first Gwar song was "Black and Huge," and the first song featuring him on vocals was "The Needle." 

"The Needle" was never released on a Metal Blade album, but it was a Slave Pit Single, and was re-recorded as "Escape From The Mooselodge" on We Kill Everything, featuring Oderus Urungus on vocals. "Black and Huge" was originally recorded after Hell-O was released in the United States.

With the exception of a few gigs in Europe in 1991 where Balsac was played by Barry 'D'live' Ward of RKL, Derks has played the character ever since. Balsac runs the Gwar mailing list and has performed in Gwar spin-off bands X-Cops, Rawg, and the Dave Brockie Experience. 

A large portion of Gwar's catalog was written (or co-written) by Balsac, who has also contributed to the production of several songs.

Slave Pit, Inc. claims Balsac joined the band in 1988, making him the second longest (after Dave Brockie) serving member of Gwar. 

When asked how exactly he walks in his awkwardly shaped boots he replied, "It's hard, man." The boots in question are actually an optical illusion, with Balsac's legs and feet going straight down, but the way the boots are made make it look as if his legs are bent backwards like a horse's leg.

In 2012, he joined the 11th Annual Independent Music Awards judging panel to assist independent musicians' careers.

In 2017, Balsac was diagnosed with myelofibrosis.

Vocal style 
In contrast to the other bandmates, Balsac speaks with a pretentious British accent. In Lust in Space, he speaks with an American accent during an argument with Oderus Urungus on the track "Where Is Zog?". He speaks without an accent during the argument in "Have You Seen Me?" from The Road Behind EP.

Guitars used

Balsac currently plays Schecter Guitars and Krank amplifiers. For a time, he played guitars that were similar in shape to the Gibson Explorer (for a brief time, he actually played one) - most photographs are seen of him playing ESP's equivalent. Before his Schecter endorsement, he played a custom signature variant of the ESP EX series, which features a single EMG 81 bridge pickup and a custom Balsac graphic. 

In the video to "Immortal Corrupter," he is seen playing a yellow-to-black Washburn Dimebag Darrell 333 guitar with red lightning bolts. Only two people had this paint job - Balsac and Dimebag Darrell himself. Balsac's guitar was stolen after the August 16, 2002 Dave Brockie eXperience concert which was recovered and given back to him by a fan in 2010. He owned a Steinberger P-series guitar, an instrument he seemed to like, though few of his fans thought it wasn't a real guitar. It was sold on eBay in 2005. He played Fernandes guitars for a time in 1997–1999.

In 2012, Schecter announced two signature models to be released in the year. It is based on a design made by ex-Nevermore guitarist Jeff Loomis. One model will feature a single Seymour Duncan Blackout Phase 2 pickup with a Tune-O-Matic bridge, along with a custom Balsac graphic where the neck pickup would be, and the 2nd model will feature 2 EMG 81 pickups and a Floyd Rose tremolo system, while being devoid of the Balsac graphic. Both guitars will have a single Balsac inlay on the 3rd fret.

He has played through Fatboy, Crate, Marshall, and Mesa Boogie amplifiers in the past. He claims he has been using Mesa/Boogie gear for over 20 years, using a Simulclass 295 Stereo power amp since 1989 and a TriAxis preamp since they were first released.

References

External links
 GWAR Official Website
 Japanese Official Website
 Balsac the Jaws of Death with GWAR - Picture Gallery

Alter Natives members
Gwar members
American heavy metal guitarists
American punk rock guitarists
Living people
American male guitarists
1950 births